Eimeria necatrix is a species of Eimeria that causes  very severe intestinal coccidiosis in older poultry characterized by congestion, hemorrhage, necrosis of the  intestine and bloody feces. Very large schizonts can be seen as white or yellow dots and oocysts can be found occasionally in the ceca.

References

Conoidasida